Theodhor Haxhifilipi also known as Dhaskal Todhri (Elbasan, active 1730–1805) was a teacher from Elbasan, who is credited as an inventor of an original Albanian alphabet. The Todhri script, as is called because of him, according to Kostandin Kristoforidhi, was either invented by Theodor, or brought by him from Voskopojë.

Life 
Not much is known about Haxhifilipi's life. There are only a few documentary sources. Haxhifilipi was probably born in the Kala neighbourhood of Elbasan, from a family of silversmiths. According to George Von Hahn, he finished his studies at the New Academy of Voskopojë. This is how Albanologist Robert Elsie describes his life:

One noted student of the New Academy in Voskopoja was Todhri (Theodor) Haxhifilipi (ca. 1730-1805), also known as Dhaskal Todhri from Elbasan, who, after training in Voskopoja, taught at the Greek school in his native Elbasan, hence the name Dhaskal (teacher). The German language scholar Johann Georg von Hahn (1811-1869), who visited Albania in the first half of the nineteenth century, refers to him as having translated not only the Old Testament but also the New Testament and other religious works. Most of his writings were unfortunately destroyed by fire during an epidemic in 1827 such that we can neither confirm nor disprove Hahn’s assertion about the Bible translations. Among the surviving fragments ascribed to Haxhifilipi, preserved both in the Central State Archives in Tirana and in the Austrian National Library in Vienna (Ser. Nova 3351), are Albanian translations of an Orthodox Book of Hours and of Mesha e Shën Jon Gojarit (The liturgy of St John Chrysostom).

Haxhifilipi is the author of a poem written in 1774 in Voskopojë, and published in a prayer book dedicated to Saint John Vladimir. Haxhifilipi was a teacher at the local Greek school in Elbasan. According to Robert Elsie, the Alphabet was used until 1930 in Elbasan.

The alphabet and other works 

It is not sure if Haxhifilipi invented the script, or was he the first one to bring it to Elbasan. According to Dhimitër Shuteriqi, the Todhri script could have been invented by Gregory of Durrës, who was also a teacher at the New Academy of Voskopojë, where Haxhifilipi was a student. The earliest dated text in Todhri's script is Radhua Hesapesh (daybook) of a local merchant partnership known as Jakov Popa i Vogël dhe Shokët. The entries in Todhri's script start on 10 August 1795 and continue until 1797. An even older text written in Todhri script is discovered recently in family notebook in Elbasan, dated 1st of January 1780. Leopold Geitler (1847–1885) and Slovenian scholar Rajko Nahtigal (1877–1958) subsequently studied the script, concluding that it was derived primarily from the Roman cursive and Greek cursive from the 18th century.

Other older texts, possibly written by Todhri himself, cannot be dated or confirmed.

See also 
 Albanian alphabet
 Elbasan script
 Vithkuqi script
 Vellara script

References 

1730 births
1805 deaths
Albanian writers
People from Elbasan
18th-century Albanian people